Sidra Batool is a Pakistani actress known for her roles in television serials such as Daagh (2012), Yeh Zindagi Hai (2012), Ishq Hamari Galiyon Mein (2013), and Parvarish (2014). Her performance in Ishq Hamari Galiyon Mein earned her a nomination for Hum Award for Best Soap Actress.

Filmography

Television
2012 Daagh as Uroosa on ARY Digital
2012 Yeh Zindagi Hai as Jannat "Jenny" Shirazi on Geo TV
2013 Khuda Dil Mein Hai as Ayesha on ARY Digital
2013 Ishq Hamari Galiyon Mein as Falak on Hum TV
2014 Parvarish as Isbah on ARY Digital
2014 Arranged Marriage as Meeral on ARY Digital
2014 Agar as Zara on ARY Digital (Telefilm)
2015 Dil Ka Kia Rung Karun Ka Kya Rung Karun as Hooriya on Hum TV
2015 Aye Zindagi as Nimra on Hum TV
2015 Wafa Na Ashna as Saman on PTV Home
2015 Love Mein Twist as Usva on PTV Home
2015 Shikkast as Mariam on Hum TV (Telefilm)
2016 Bin Roye as Mahnoor (cameo appearance)
2017 Shikwa Nahi Kissi Se as Navaal
2020 Umeed as Umeed ;Drama of Har Pal Geo

References 

Living people
Pakistani female models
Pakistani television actresses
21st-century Pakistani actresses
1985 births